Questo mondo è per te is a 2011 Italian comedy film directed by Francesco Falaschi.

Cast
Matteo Petrini as Teo
Eugenia Costantini as Chiara
Paolo Sassanelli as Italo
Cecilia Dazzi as Laura
Fabrizia Sacchi as Carlotta
Edoardo Natoli as Marco
Domenico Diele as Luca Martini
Massimiliano Bruno as Vagoni
Paolo Migone as Pierluigi
Sergio Sgrilli as Company owner

References

External links

2011 films
2010s Italian-language films
2011 comedy films
Italian comedy films
Films directed by Francesco Falaschi
Films set in Tuscany
2010s Italian films